Maloye Pogorelovo is a rural locality (a village) in Shelotskoye Rural Settlement, Verkhovazhsky District, Vologda Oblast, Russia. The population was 13 as of 2002.

Geography 
Maloye Pogorelovo is located 56 km southwest of Verkhovazhye (the district's administrative centre) by road. Bolshoye Pogorelovo is the nearest rural locality.

References 

Rural localities in Verkhovazhsky District